Hanne Harlem (born 20 November 1964) is a Norwegian politician for the Labour Party. She was personal secretary to Minister of Family and Consumer Affairs in 1990, personal secretary to the Minister of Children and Family Affairs in 1991 and Minister of Justice from 2000 to 2001, in Jens Stoltenberg's first cabinet. 

In October 2019, she was nominated to become the next Parliamentary Ombudsman. She assumed office on 1 February 2020.

Personal life 
She is a daughter of Gudmund Harlem and sister of former Norwegian Prime Minister Gro Harlem Brundtland. She is married to lawyer Sam E. Harris, with whom she has three children.

References

1964 births
Living people
Politicians from Oslo
Government ministers of Norway
Ministers for children, young people and families
Women government ministers of Norway
Female justice ministers
Ministers of Justice of Norway
Parliamentary ombudspersons in Norway